Jacques Bonnaffé (born 22 June 1958) is a French actor and stage director. He has appeared in more than ninety films since 1980.

Debut
Jacques Bonnaffé was formed at the Lille Conservatory after his high school years in Douai (North) where he practiced amateur theater.

At 20, he started in the film Anthracite directed by Édouard Niermans.

In 1995, he is the French voice of actor Kevin Spacey in the film The Usual Suspects.

He directs plays with contemporary authors like Joseph Danan, Jean-Christophe Bailly in Nature loves to hide. Since September 2015 he is everyday on France Culture for his column "Jacques Bonnaffé read Poetry".

Theater

Filmography

Awards and nominations

César Award

Molière Award

Audio books
He also recorded several audio books:

Discourse on the Method by René Descartes (2003)
Gargantua by François Rabelais (2004)
La main coupée by Blaise Cendrars (2005)
L'Oral et Hardi by Jean-Pierre Verheggen (2003)
L'Oral et Hardi by Jean-Pierre Verheggen (2013), Camino Verde version

External links

 

1958 births
Living people
People from Douai
French male film actors
20th-century French male actors
21st-century French male actors
French male stage actors
French male television actors
Audiobook narrators